Aliiglaciecola litoralis is a gram-negative, aerobic, non-pigmented, catalase- and oxidase-positive, rod-shaped motile bacterium from the genus of Aliiglaciecola which was isolated from a marine sandy sample of the Sea of Japan. Aestuariibacter litoralis has been reclassified to Aliiglaciecola litoralis.

References

Alteromonadales
Bacteria described in 2010